Xosé Ramón Barreiro Fernández (2 December 1936 – 17 March 2021) was a Spanish historian. He was president of the Royal Galician Academy from 2001 to 2009.

References

20th-century Spanish historians
21st-century Spanish historians
1936 births
2021 deaths